All This Useless Beauty is the seventeenth studio album by the English singer-songwriter Elvis Costello, released in 1996 by Warner Bros. Records. It is his tenth and final album with his long-standing backing band the Attractions, and the last album he delivered under his contract to the Warner Bros. label, his contract expiring with a further compilation album, Extreme Honey. It peaked at number 28 on the UK album chart, and at number 53 on the Billboard 200.

Content
In its original conception, the album was to be a two-disc set of songs written for other artists, entitled A Case for Song, with backing by a diverse array of musicians, influenced by his participation in the 1995 Meltdown Festival. Aspects of this concept survived to the final album, as four songs previously released by others made it to the final track listing: "The Other End of the Telescope," co-written with Aimee Mann and originally recorded by 'Til Tuesday; "You Bowed Down," recorded by Roger McGuinn; "All This Useless Beauty" and "I Want to Vanish," recorded by June Tabor. The title is a sarcastic reference to what Costello thought would be the fate of the album.

Instead, Costello hired the Attractions, and recorded the songs at Windmill Lane Studios in Dublin and Westside Studios in London with production by Geoff Emerick and engineering by Jon Jacobs. "Complicated Shadows" had been intended for Johnny Cash, and "Why Can't A Man Stand Alone?" for Sam Moore, but neither singer elected to record them. Another of his collaborations with Paul McCartney appears, "Shallow Grave".

Unusually, six tracks were released as singles in either the United Kingdom or the United States; "It's Time", "Little Atoms", "The Other End of the Telescope", "Distorted Angel", "All This Useless Beauty" and "You Bowed Down". Four of these—"Little Atoms", "The Other End of the Telescope", "Distorted Angel", and "All This Useless Beauty"—were released the same month as part of a limited-time promotion campaign, with each single featuring covers of songs from the album by other artists, such as Lush, Sleeper, and Tricky. Costello, who described the release as a "pop art project" where each single got deleted one week after its initial launch, explained:

"It's Time" charted at number 58 in the UK, while all of the four limited promotional releases but "Distorted Angel" reached the 90s on the UK charts. "You Bowed Down" reached number eight on the Billboard Adult Alternative Songs chart.

Release history
The album was released initially on compact disc, cassette & LP in 1996. As part of the Rhino Records reissue campaign for Costello's back catalogue from Demon/Columbia and Warners, it was re-released in 2001 with 17 additional tracks on a bonus disc. Additional tracks continued the album's initial concept, tracks intended for recording by or in collaboration with other artists. "The Days Take Care of Themselves" and "The Comedians" had been written for Roy Orbison, his recording of the latter appearing on Mystery Girl, while "The Only Flame in Town" had been intended for Aaron Neville. "The World's Great Optimist," another collaboration with Aimee Mann, appeared on her Bachelor No. 2 album, and Johnny Cash recorded "Hidden Shame" on Boom Chicka Boom. This reissue is out of print, the album reissued again by Universal Music Group after its acquisition of Costello's complete catalogue in 2006.

Track listing
All tracks written by Elvis Costello, except where noted; track lengths taken from the 2001 Rhino reissue.

 "The Other End of the Telescope" (Costello, Aimee Mann) – 4:06
 "Little Atoms" – 3:58
 "All This Useless Beauty" – 4:39
 "Complicated Shadows" – 4:43
 "Why Can't a Man Stand Alone?" – 3:14
 "Distorted Angel" – 4:31
 "Shallow Grave" (MacManus, Paul McCartney) – 2:07
 "Poor Fractured Atlas" – 4:02
 "Starting to Come to Me" – 2:43
 "You Bowed Down" – 4:55
 "It's Time" – 6:00
 "I Want to Vanish" – 3:16

2001 bonus disc
Tracks 4, 6, 7, and 9–16 are solo demo recordings.

 "Almost Ideal Eyes" – 4:23 (released as the B-side to "Little Atoms" in the UK and "You Bowed Down" in the US)
 "My Dark Life" (with Brian Eno) – 6:25 (released on Songs in the Key of X)
 "That Day Is Done" (with The Fairfield Four) (MacManus, McCartney) – 5:11 (released on I Couldn't Hear Nobody Pray)
 "What Do I Do Now?" (Louise Wener) – 4:29 (released on 17 Volume (Fifth Birthday Bumper Bonanza!)
 "The Bridge I Burned" – 5:23 (released on Extreme Honey)
 "It's Time" – 4:00
 "Complicated Shadows" – 2:27
 "You Bowed Down" – 4:21 (demo with The Attractions)
 "Mistress and Maid" (MacManus, McCartney) – 2:20
 "Distorted Angel" – 2:33
 "World's Great Optimist" (Costello, Mann) – 2:34
 "The Only Flame in Town" – 4:14
 "The Comedians" – 3:09
 "The Days Take Care of Everything" – 4:00
 "Hidden Shame" – 3:59
 "Why Can't a Man Stand Alone" – 3:01
 "Distorted Angel" (Tricky remix) – 5:35 (released as the B-side to "All This Useless Beauty" in the US and "You Bowed Down" in the UK)

Personnel
 Elvis Costello – vocals, guitars, bass, piano, other instruments
The Attractions
 Steve Nieve – piano, keyboards, drum programming 
 Bruce Thomas – bass
 Pete Thomas – drums, percussion, acoustic guitar 
Additional musicians
 Peter Whyman – bass clarinet 
 Roy Babbington – double bass 
 Brodsky Quartet – string quartet 
 Ruth Causey – clarinet 
 Brian Eno – gadgets 
 The Fairfield Four – vocals 
 Larry Knechtel – piano 
 Matt MacManus – Fender bass, drum loop 
 Danny Goffey – drums 
 Ned Douglas – sample control

Charts
Album

Single

References

External links
 

Elvis Costello albums
1996 albums
Albums produced by Elvis Costello
Rhino Records albums
Warner Records albums
Albums produced by Geoff Emerick